The Keystone Service is a 195 mile (314 km) regional passenger train service from Amtrak between the Harrisburg Transportation Center in Harrisburg, Pennsylvania, and 30th Street Station in Philadelphia, running along the Philadelphia to Harrisburg Main Line (Keystone Corridor). Most trains continue along the Northeast Corridor (NEC) to Penn Station in New York City.

Trips between Harrisburg and New York take approximately  hours, including  hours between Harrisburg and Philadelphia. There are also several express trains that cut both journey times by approximately 15 minutes.

It is Amtrak's fifth-busiest route and the third-busiest in the NEC. In fiscal year 2016, the service carried 1.47 million passengers, an increase of 7.9% over FY2015. Total revenue in FY2016 was $41,123,787, an increase of 7.5% over FY2015. The route is primarily funded by the Pennsylvania Department of Transportation (PennDOT).

History

Takeover from Penn Central 
The Keystone Service is the successor of numerous services running along the Philadelphia to Harrisburg Main Line dating from 1857, when the Pennsylvania Railroad (PRR) bought the Philadelphia and Columbia Railroad, enabling service between Philadelphia and Harrisburg.

When the Metroliner high-speed program had begun two years earlier, the state had attempted to capitalize on the opportunity to purchase upgraded rolling stock for the 600-series trains. On August 30, 1966, Governor William Scranton of Pennsylvania announced plans to purchase 11 Metroliners for  service to replace the Silverliners then used. The cars were ordered through Philadelphia commuter agency SEPTA, as the state was not permitted to contract directly with the PRR. The state, SEPTA, and PRR reached an agreement on November 3; the state and SEPTA would each pay $2 million, funded mostly by mass transit grants from the newly formed Department of Housing and Urban Development (HUD), and the PRR would receive a free 15-year lease of the cars. The PRR soon withdrew after complaints from competing Red Arrow Lines and Capitol Trailways, and the HUD grants were later found not to be applicable to intercity service.

In June 1968, an agreement was reached where the state Transportation Assistance Authority would pay $2 million and Penn Central would pay $2.5 million for the 11 Metroliners for Harrisburg service. On July 14, a 4-car train was tested on the line, with several demonstration runs for officials on August 21. On February 25, 1970, the cars intended for Harrisburg service completed their performance testing. Penn Central refused to accept the cars, citing numerous technical issues with the cars and their general unsuitability for the service. They had worse acceleration than the Silverliners already in service, tended to overheat when making numerous closely spaced stops, and had difficulty climbing the grade out of Suburban Station. Additionally, the corridor lacked high-level platforms to effectively use the cars, and 15 substations would require expensive modifications. The 11 cars were unused for some time before Penn Central ultimately decided to lease the cars for use on the core New York–Washington service. They were moved back to the Budd plant for modifications in April. In July 1970, the state authorized $100,000 to upgrade existing Silverliners for the Harrisburg service instead.

When Amtrak was created to take over intercity passenger rail service in 1971, there was substantial debate about whether some trains constituted intercity services (to be either taken over by Amtrak or discontinued, relieving private companies like Penn Central of the financial burden) or commuter services (to be retained by the private companies unless discontinuance was approved by the ICC). Penn Central alleged that several of its regional services – the 600-series trains, connecting Lancaster–York buses, Clockers, and New York–Chatham service – were intercity services that could be discontinued since they were not included in Amtrak's initial system.

On March 31, 1971, Penn Central filed with ICC to discontinue the 600-series trains at the conclusion of their contract with SEPTA on June 30. The state filed suit against Penn Central on April 7 to stop the discontinuance. On April 23, Penn Central filed in District Court to discontinue the regional services. Five days later, the state and the UTU filed an opposing suit, calling the trains a commuter service. On April 30, Judge John P. Fullam ordered Penn Central to continue operating the trains and referred the case to the ICC.

When Amtrak took over intercity service on May 1, 1971, the 600-series trains continued to be operated by Penn Central, though they were listed in Amtrak schedules. The city of Philadelphia and the state both preferred to have Penn Central rather than Amtrak operate the service, as Amtrak was exempt from state control. On June 21, the ICC ruled that the service was not intercity rail, as sought by the state and not by Penn Central. On August 3, Fullam ordered Penn Central to continue operating the regional services.

On October 29, 1972, after further negotiations with Penn Central, Amtrak took over operation of the 600-series trains as Silverliner Service, named for the Silverliner cars used to run the trains. Amtrak assumed formal responsibility for the Silverliner Service and Clockers around April 1974. Penn Central (and later Conrail and finally SEPTA Regional Rail) continued to operate Paoli–Philadelphia commuter service. Amtrak took over ticketing for the Silverliner Service and Clockers from Penn Central on July 1, 1975. On October 26, 1975, SEPTA funded an increase from 9 to 11 daily round trips. Amtrak began including a listing of connecting trains to/from New York City in the November 1975 timetable.

Declining service 

In the late 1970s, NJDOT's new Arrow III railcars arrived several years ahead of the completion of electrification projects to allow their use in New Jersey commuter service. Amtrak by this time was desperate for electric propulsion, as the aging GG1 locomotives were reaching the end of their usefulness, replacement E60 locomotives were proving unreliable, and new EMD AEM-7 locomotives were only just beginning to arrive. In April 1978, Amtrak leased 70 of NJDOT's Arrow II cars for use on the Clockers, Keystone Service, and the new Chesapeake. By January 1979, the Arrows were rotated between the Clockers and Silverliner Service. The Arrows had bathrooms and water fountains, making them more suitable for the regional service than the Silverliners. In late 1980, under pressure from NJDOT, Amtrak returned all but 32 of the Arrows, which created a need to find other equipment for the Silverliner Service. Despite being pronounced unsuitable for Harrisburg service a decade before, the Metroliners were the only easily available rolling stock, as they were being slowly retired from the eponymous service. A test run with Metroliners was made on January 20, 1981, and Metroliners were used in revenue service for two weeks in February. Metroliners were used on the New York – Harrisburg Valley Forge for a week in August, and a maintenance facility at Harrisburg opened on October 13, 1981.

As the new AEM-7 locomotives continued to arrive, Amtrak assigned them to haul crack Metroliner trains with Amfleet consists and reassigned the less-reliable Metroliners for the secondary Philadelphia–Harrisburg service, calling them Capitoliners. On October 25, 1981, the service was rebranded as Keystone Service. All service was then operated by the Metroliners, which lacked the quick acceleration of the Silverliners and Arrows and made them unsuitable for the service. After a single Metroliner set was withdrawn from Clocker service in March 1982, the Keystone Service was the only remaining use of the Metroliners. On April 24, 1983, a pair of weekday trains – the 9:54am arrival and 3:55pm departure from Suburban Station – were renamed Keystone Executive. Intended to attract riders from the western end of the corridor, the trains made intermediate stops only at Lancaster, Downingtown, and 30th Street, with a 99-minute schedule.

The first westbound train of the morning made numerous local stops for commuters to Harrisburg, including some at stations not served by any other Amtrak train. This was first shown in the April 29, 1973, schedule. These one-off stops were gradually dropped: Merion in 1979; 52nd Street and Berwyn in 1980; Radnor and Narberth in 1982; and Bryn Mawr, Overbrook, and Wayne in 1987.

The Silverliner Service carried over one million passengers in 1980, but ridership was in steep decline from a variety of factors. On October 30, 1983, Amtrak reduced the service from 11 to 9 weekday round trips, prompting an 8% drop in ridership. A decrease to 6 weekday round trips on January 12, 1986, and 5 round trips on April 27, cut ridership by an additional 45%. The cuts included the termination of the Keystone Executive. Despite the loss of service, fares doubled from 1980 to 1987. By 1990, SEPTA carried 595,000 passengers west of Paoli, twice that of Amtrak's ridership on the entire Keystone Service.

The Metroliner cars, worn out from nearly two decades of heavy use, began to fail frequently. In April 1985, Amtrak began studying the possibility of removing electrification west of Paoli. On-time performance decreased from around 85% in 1985 to below 60% in early 1988. On January 25, 1988, Amtrak began towing the Metroliner cars with AEM-7 locomotives rather than running them under their own power, although the cars had their pantographs up to power lighting and heating systems. A wreck of the Night Owl four days later two took AEM-7 locomotives out of commission, exacerbating a shortage of electric power available to Amtrak. On February 1, Amtrak converted all Keystone Service trains to diesel power and terminated them on the lower level of 30th Street Station, as diesel-powered trains were not allowed in the tunnels to Suburban Station. The change was listed as "temporary" on timetables starting on May 15, 1988, and lasting into 1990. After dieselization and the lengthening of schedules, on-time performance jumped up to consistently over 90%.

Through service 

At its inception on May 1, 1971, Amtrak ran two through services on the line: the combined New York–Chicago Broadway Limited and New York–St. Louis Spirit of St. Louis (soon renamed National Limited), and the Pittsburgh–New York Duquesne (soon renamed Keystone). The former train stopped only at Lancaster and Paoli between Harrisburg and North Philadelphia; it was intended for long-distance travelers between the East Coast and the Midwest rather than local passengers. The Duquesne/Keystone had one additional stop at Coatesville and was intended for medium-distance intercity travel.

Amtrak discontinued the Keystone on April 30, 1972, leaving the 600-series trains as the only local service along their route. The Broadway Limited and National Limited were split; they added local stops west of Harrisburg, but passengers from between Harrisburg and Philadelphia had to change trains at Harrisburg, Lancaster, Paoli, or Philadelphia to reach stops west of Harrisburg or north of Philadelphia. On October 28, 1973, Amtrak changed the weekday-only Valley Forge from a Philadelphia–New Haven local train to a Harrisburg–New York City train. It only made the same intermediate stops as the Keystone, including no direct service to 30th Street Station. However, its introduction meant that through passengers no longer had to change at Philadelphia or rely on the Broadway Limited, whose on-time performance had plunged to just 6.8% in 1973.

Additional local stops in Pennsylvania were later added. On May 19, 1974, Amtrak added weekend service on the Valley Forge: a Saturday train from Harrisburg to Boston, and a Sunday train from Boston to Harrisburg. The weekend service ended on October 26, 1975. On December 17, 1979, the westbound Valley Forge began stopping at 30th Street rather than bypassing it using the Pittsburgh Subway; however, it retained the Ardmore stop.

The Washington sections of the Broadway Limited and National Limited originally split at Harrisburg and reached the Northeast Corridor via the Port Road Branch. The Washington section of the Broadway Limited was rerouted through Philadelphia on October 26, 1975; the National Limited followed suit on October 29, 1978. The National Limited was discontinued entirely on October 1, 1979; the state began funding the Pittsburgh–Philadelphia Pennsylvanian as a replacement on April 27, 1980.

At the same time, a pair of Clockers, the westbound Keystone and eastbound Big Apple, were extended to Harrisburg on weekends. They ran within an hour of the Valley Forge weekday schedule; however, they ran to 30th Street and Suburban stations rather than only serving North Philadelphia. The Keystone was renamed Susquehanna on October 25, 1981. The Big Apple and Susquehanna dropped the Suburban Station stop a year later, but continued to serve 30th Street. On October 30, 1983, the Pennsylvanian was extended to New York City, eliminating the transfer at Philadelphia (although it continued to stop at 30th Street). On January 12, 1986, the eastbound Valley Forge began serving 30th Street (as the westbound had for six years); this allowed it to effectively replace a canceled Keystone Service train (#600, the first morning eastbound) to serve commuters.

Amtrak began operating the Atlantic City–Philadelphia Atlantic City Express in 1989, and later extended it along several busy corridors in hopes of increasing ridership. On April 4, 1991, one daily Keystone Service round trip was extended to Atlantic City under the Atlantic City Express brand. Only a weekend round trip continued to be through-routed. The Atlantic City Express was discontinued on April 2, 1995; New Jersey Transit Atlantic City Line trains continue to serve 30th Street Station.

Modern improvements 

Amtrak added the stations to several existing round trips as a result.

Beginning in 2000, Amtrak and PennDOT spent $166 million to rehabilitate the Philadelphia to Harrisburg Main Line. When the project was completed and electric service began in October 2006, travel times between Harrisburg and Philadelphia were reduced from 120 minutes to 95 minutes, with further time savings for through trains by eliminating the need for an engine change at Philadelphia. Service was also increased from 11 to 14 daily round trips. By FY 2010, ridership was up 91% since FY 2000 and 58% since FY 2006.

The last two such at-grade crossings on the line, located just east of Mount Joy, were closed on September 24, 2014. They were replaced with a bridge connecting to a nearby street. Private crossings continue to be used on the line, however.

On March 18, 2020, Amtrak temporarily suspended all Keystone Service trains due to declining demand because of the ongoing COVID-19 pandemic. Service between Philadelphia and Harrisburg resumed on June 1, 2020, with all-reserved seating. On July 6, 2020, Amtrak restored one Keystone Service train in each direction running the full route between New York City and Harrisburg. Amtrak restored full service between Philadelphia and Harrisburg on September 8, 2020. On January 4, 2021, Amtrak reduced service levels along the  Keystone Service due to decreased ridership caused by the COVID-19 pandemic. With the reduction in service, the Keystone Service had seven roundtrips on weekdays and six roundtrips on weekends between Philadelphia and Harrisburg, with three daily roundtrips running the full route between New York City and Harrisburg. Most pre-pandemic service was restored on April 25, 2022, with eleven weekday Philadelphia–Harrisburg round trips.

Proposed expansion 
Proposals for an infill station in Paradise Township have been under considerations since the 1990s. The stop would be about halfway between Lancaster and Parkesburg, serving the local Plain community and allowing tourists to transfer to the Strasburg Rail Road. A July 2004 plan was rejected by the Federal Railroad Administration over concerns that the curved track would preclude ADA-compliant boarding platforms.

Operation

Equipment 

Most Keystone Service trains consist of five cars – four Amfleet I coaches plus a Metroliner cab car – paired with a Siemens ACS-64 electric locomotive. The service has a single class of service, coach class, configured with 2x2 seating.
Trains are unreserved between Harrisburg and Philadelphia and reserved coaches between Philadelphia and New York. Unlike most Amtrak routes, no food service is available on Keystone Service trains.

In the late 2020s and early 2030s, all equipment will be replaced with Amtrak Airo trainsets, the railroad's branding of its combination of Siemens Venture passenger cars and a Siemens Charger diesel-electric locomotive. The trainsets for the Keystone Service will have six passenger cars, which will include a food service area and a mix of 2x2 coach class and 2x1 business class seating. The car closest to the locomotive will be a specialized "Auxiliary Power Vehicle" which will include a pantograph to collect power from overhead lines and traction motors in the car and the locomotive.

Before the signal, track, and catenary upgrades that were completed in October 2006, Keystone Service trains used GE Genesis diesel locomotives between Harrisburg and Philadelphia.

Route 

The Keystone Service operates entirely over Amtrak-owned trackage:
Amtrak Philadelphia to Harrisburg Main Line, Harrisburg–Philadelphia
Amtrak Northeast Corridor, Philadelphia–New York

Service 
On weekdays there are thirteen Keystone trains and one Pennsylvanian train in each direction. All trains run between Harrisburg and Philadelphia, with nine Keystone trains plus the Pennsylvanian continuing on to New York. There are eight round-trip trains on both Saturdays and Sundays. All but one, including the Pennsylvanian, make the full trip between Harrisburg and New York. On the majority of the trains, the journey between Harrisburg and New York takes approximately 3 hours and 30 minutes, including 1 hour and 45 minutes to travel between Harrisburg and Philadelphia. There are also several express trains which cut both journey times by approximately 15 minutes each.

Station stops

References

Notes

External links 

Amtrak routes
Passenger rail transportation in New York (state)
Passenger rail transportation in New Jersey
Passenger rail transportation in Pennsylvania
Higher-speed rail